is a Japanese anime television series created by Jūzō Mutsuki and Wonderfarm and produced by NBCUniversal Entertainment Japan, Pioneer Entertainment (USA) LP., and TNK. It is directed by Shinichiro Kimura and Tetsuya Yanagisawa, with Kazuki Matsui handling series composition, Katsuzō Hirata designing the characters and Toshio Masuda composing the music. The anime first aired on Wowow between July 6 and September 22, 2000, running for 10 episodes. An OVA was bundled with a DVD box set released on February 21, 2001. The series centers on the adventures of the main character, Kazuya Saotome, and a robotic Cyberdoll named May. Formerly available from Geneon in the United States, it is now out of print.

Story
His lifelong dream is to build a Doraemon (robot), and is  trying to develop an artificial intelligence (AI) robot that happens to look like a toy squid. The story begins when Kazuya's wealthy rival, Kotaro Nanbara, gives him a computer program that supposedly will provide valuable information to help with Kazuya's research and development. Actually, the program is a virus that Nanbara created in order to infect Kazuya's computer and destroy his work. While attempting to fix his infected computer, Kazuya accidentally orders a "cyberdoll" from the Cyberdyne Corporation website. A woman appears at Kazuya's door with a small package containing a cyberdoll named Hand Maid May. May is a palm-sized robotic doll who is very sensitive and sympathetic to Kazuya's feelings, likes, and needs. The early part of the storyline focuses on Nanbara trying to get May taken away from Kazuya due to his inability to pay for her. Nanbara enlists the help of several other cyberdolls to attempt to take May away from Kazuya, but all of them end up falling for Kazuya and failing to retrieve May.

In the latter part of the anime, May is upgraded to a lifesize version of herself after Kazuya receives a visit from a mysterious visitor who wishes to promote Kazuya's artificial intelligence research. The situation complicates further when Kazuya's human friend Kasumi begins to get jealous of all the Cyberdolls flirting with Kazuya and they all compete to see who can go on a date with him. The last segment of the story deals with Kazuya and May having to deal with a virus which is shutting down all of the cyberdolls, and a couple of mysterious visitors who turn out to be related to Kazuya and Nanbara in the future.

Characters

Main characters

Kazuya is a 19-year-old electrical engineering student with a passion for building robots, primarily a robot squid which he calls Ikariya and implementing an AI system into it. He is a bit absent-minded and is clueless when it comes to girls. He has two sisters as shown in the 7th episode. However it is later revealed that in the future, his work with Ikariya will eventually become the basis for the M.a.i.d. Program (short for Meet Ai Departure, Ai means Love in Japanese). Kazuya lives in apartment 204 of Kasumi House. His life becomes more complicated but yet more satisfying after the arrival of cyberdoll May and the subsequent cyberdolls.

Kasumi is the 18-year-old daughter of the owners of Kasumi House, a small wooden apartment building. Her window faces Kazuya's window, so she uses a long ladder that runs from his balcony to hers as a bridge to pay him a visit, along with Rena. Because she's a close friend of Kazuya's, she often lets him get away with overdue rent payments. In addition to being a college student, Kasumi is very active, athletic, and likes baseball. She is a coach for the local little league baseball team, and her uniform number is 33. She is shown to have a tomboyish side, as she refers to herself as "boku" (the Japanese male form of "I"), but she has a kind side. She has feelings for Kazuya and will wear more revealing outfits when coming to visit him. She sees the cyberdolls, primarily May, as a friendly rival for his affections.

The self-proclaimed "best friend and worst enemy" of Kazuya Saotome. Nanbara is very rich with an eccentric, egomaniacal personality. He is jealous of being outdone in projects by the Kazuya. His virus caused Kazuya to inadvertently order May. Nanbara gets Sara to do his chores by offering ramen in exchange. Though very antagonistic against May in her smaller form in earlier episodes, he falls in love when she is enlarged to human size. It is later revealed that he and Kazuya will form the Cyberdyne Corporation that produces the Cyberdolls and will be run by their descendants.

Cyberdolls

A hand-sized 1/6 scale cyberdoll from the Cyberdyne Corporation (not to be confused with The Terminator's robotic company, Cyberdyne Systems). Kazuya receives May because of an accidental order which happened as a result of a revenge tactic planted in a DVD-RAM from his rival, Nanbara. She has to be plugged into Kazuya's computer via a homemade cable in order to recharge her batteries because May's official recharging equipment was accidentally broken when Kazuya first received her. May was never paid for by Kazuya, and thus became a target for Sara and Cyberdyne in early episodes.
As a cyberdoll, she can control traffic lights and simple electronics, and can connect to personal computers via what may or may not be USB cables. She later becomes a human-sized 17-year-old version (courtesy of Cyber-X) following her repossession. Her personality is innocent, and at times childish and naive, though she also shows surprising insight and is always able to cheer Kazuya up. Unlike the other cyberdolls, May's Maid Program had evolved (according to Kei during her analysis), making her more human and resistant to the retro-cybervirus that threatened the other cyberdolls. She shows strong feelings towards Kazuya and is often competing with Kasumi. In the last episode it has also been stated that she can give birth.

Sara is a 23-year-old Cyberdoll from Cyberdyne's Customer Service division, she has tan skin, silver hair, pointed ears and wears a Chinese qipao. She is addicted to ramen and seems to have an endless stomach for it. Her goal early on is to repossess Cyberdoll May because Kazuya did not pay for her. She later develops a crush on Kazuya.

Another Cyberdoll in the form of a 9-year-old child sent by Cyberdyne to recover May. She was first discovered by Kazuya and May as a lost child. Rena decides that she likes Kazuya and Ikariya, and therefore does not return May to Cyberdyne; instead she moves in with Kasumi. In the Japanese audio, she is referred to by everyone, including herself, as "Rena-chan." She has the ability to produce supersonic screams.

Kei is a 21-year-old genius Cyberdoll said to have an IQ of 50,000 in human terms. Kei is given the mission of formulating a strategy to get May back, but becomes interested in Kazuya after hearing how he regards Cyberdolls and changes her mind. Kei's memory bank of facts is extensive, but she often takes a while to process information that is more abstract. At times, abstract or philosophical questions can cause her CPU to lock up. She later develops a crush on Kazuya and takes up residence in his closet.

Mami, age 31, is from Cyberdyne's American branch and is a combination of both Japanese and American cultures (she wears both a kimono and roller blades. She has the habit of saying  when amazed or otherwise. She arrives later to help Kazuya around the house, and is gifted at domestic tasks which causes May to be jealous. Even so, Mami tries to pair Kazuya and May up. She is later revealed to be the caretaker of Kazuya's descendant Takuya Saotome.

Cyberdyne Corporation
 / 

He is Kazuya's descendant. In his initial appearances he wears a red trenchcoat, white pants, and a yellow hat, and wears a type of muscle suit that covers his torso and arms with specifications (which is to hide his obese body). He also wears a specially-designed helmet that has an opening mouthpiece to eat or drink (especially milk which is his favorite). He first appears in the second episode watching over May, and in the same episode guides Kazuya (without his knowledge) to May who was lost in the city. He fully introduces himself in the 5th episode after May is repossessed. He shows interest in Kazuya's research with Artificial Intelligence, and allows Kazuya to choose a Cyberdoll for research. To Kazuya's request he arranges May to be returned to him and in a full-sized body as a bonus. His main ability lies in his incredibly fast typing skills, which even with only one hand was able to keep up with Kotaro's long and fast password. He is not fully unmasked until after the credits in the 10th episode, where he shown with green hair and wearing glasses with orange lens and red trim.
 / 

The so-called "Wandering President of Cyberdyne", Totaro is every bit as egomaniacal as his ancestor Kotaro, although he has a stronger streak of common sense. He normally wears a kind of scarlet bodysuit and cape (A reference to Kaiketsu Zubat), and makes a big production during his introductions (His introduction dialogue is very similar to Kaiketsu Zubat's). Apparently, he and Kazuya's descendant has formed a partnership in running Cyberdyne, with Takuya in research and development and Totaro handling the financial ends. He comes to Kotaro to warn him and Kazuya about the virus.

The Whirlwind of Love cast
 / 

 / 

 /

Other characters

A robotic squid and Kazuya's Doraemon Research Project. It is primitive compared to the Cyberdolls. Rena has a fondness for Ikariya, taking it wherever she goes.

Kazuya's next door neighbor who resides in room 203. He sometimes make huge crushing sounds, causing Kasumi to run back to chase him for the rent. He also helps to provide ice blocks for Kasumi to lower the temperature of the Cyberdolls in Episode 10. He shows up again with no appearance but with crushing sounds in the last episode. It also seems only Kasumi, Rena and May saw his appearance.

Kasumi's mother.

A lolicon and cosplay fanatic who lives in room 201 of Kasumi House.

Episode list

Theme songs
Opening Theme - 
Arrangement - Hiroo Oyagi, Kaoru Okubo
Composition, Lyrics - Hiroo Oyagi
Artist - P-Chicks

Ending Theme - 
Composition, Arrangement - Toshio Matsuda
Lyrics - Yuko Matsuzaki
Artist - Mikako Takahashi

Spinoff series
Wonderfarm worked on a spinoff OVA series titled Hand Maid Mai, which focuses on a completely different cast of characters. The first episode was released on January 18, 2003, but the series was cancelled due to the bankruptcy of distributor Five Ways.

References

External links

2000 anime television series debuts
Anime with original screenplays
Geneon USA
Harem anime and manga
NBCUniversal Entertainment Japan
Romantic comedy anime and manga
Science fiction anime and manga
TNK (company)
Wowow original programming